is a 1928 Japanese black-and-white silent film with benshi accompaniment directed by Shozo Makino. It was an epic created to commemorate Makino's 50th birthday  and is based on the classic theme of the Chūshingura. During the production of this film, a fire broke out, destroying parts of the original film, but it has since been restored.

External links
 

1928 films
Films about the Forty-seven Ronin
Japanese silent films
1920s historical films
Japanese black-and-white films